Ryōta, Ryota or Ryouta is a masculine Japanese given name. Notable people with the name include:

, Nippon Professional Baseball player for the Orix Buffaloes
Ryota Aoki (footballer, born 1984), Japanese footballer who plays for JEF United Ichihara Chiba
Ryota Aoki (footballer, born 1996), Japanese footballer who plays for Nagoya Grampus
, Japanese footballer
, Japanese footballer
, Japanese rugby union player
, Japanese footballer
, Japanese baseball player
, Japanese baseball player
, Japanese footballer
, Japanese singer and actor
, Japanese footballer
, Japanese musician 
, Japanese bandoneón player
, Japanese football player
, Japanese footballer
, Japanese footballer
, Japanese actor
, Japanese boxer
, Japanese footballer
, Japanese footballer
, Japanese voice actor
, Japanese footballer
, Japanese actor  
, Japanese voice actor
, Japanese footballer
, Japanese footballer
, Japanese politician serving in the House of Representatives in the Diet
, Japanese voice actor
, Japanese badminton player
, Nippon Professional Baseball player for the Yomiuri Giants in Japan's Central League
, Japanese footballer
, Japanese sprinter
, Japanese nordic combined skier
, Japanese sumo wrestler

Fictional Characters

 from Danganronpa 3: The End of Kibougamine Gakuen
 from Kakegurui

Japanese masculine given names